Pinbarren is a rural town and locality in the Shire of Noosa, Queensland, Australia.

Geography
Pinbarren is on the Sunshine Coast,  from the centre of Noosa Heads. It is located at the foot of Mount Pinbarren. Its southern boundary is marked by Six Mile Creek.

Mount Pinbarren is located in Mount Pinbarren National Park which was established in 1929.

History
The name Pinbarren appears to be a corruption of an Aboriginal name Pimperon for the local mountain.

Pinbarren Creek Provisional School opened in 1905. On 1 January 1909, it became Pinbarren Creek State School. The school was closed in 1939. From 1939 to 1943 the Pomona School Forestry Club planted Hoop Pine, Kauri Pine, Flooded Gum and Silky Oak trees on the school site and it was named the Pomona Memorial Forestry Plot on 31 October 1944. A white cross and memorial plaque are present alongside the Pomona-Kin Kin Road.

Pinbarren Community Christian College opened on 10 February 2003.

Pinbarren is within the local government area of Shire of Noosa, but between 2008 and 2013 it was within Sunshine Coast Region.

References

External links

 Town map of Pinbarren, 1973

Suburbs of Noosa Shire, Queensland
Localities in Queensland